Steve, Steven or Stephen Hall may refer to:

Sports
Steve Hall (Canadian football) (born 1960), Canadian football player
Steven Hall (rugby union) (born 1972), French rugby union player
Steve Hall (rugby league) (born 1979), English rugby league player
Steve Hall (American football) (born 1973), American football player
Steven Hall (footballer) (born 2005), Australian football player

Politics and government
Steve Hall (politician) (born 1956), member of the Tennessee House of Representatives
Stephen Hall (politician) (1941–2014), American police officer, realtor and politician
Steve Clark Hall (born 1953), retired United States Navy submarine officer and documentary film maker
Stephen Holmes (CIA), CIA officer who used Steven Hall as alias
Stephen Hall (judge), justice with the Supreme Court of Western Australia

Other
Stephen G. Hall (born 1953), British economist and academic
Steven Ray Hall (born 1959), American professor of aeronautics and astronautics
Stephen Hall (actor) (born 1969), Australian actor and writer
Steven Hall (author) (born 1975), British novelist

See also
Stephen Hall House, a historic house in Reading, Massachusetts
Stephen King-Hall (1893–1966), British journalist, politician and playwright
Hall (surname)